Lambula bivittata is a moth of the family Erebidae. It was described by Walter Rothschild in 1912. It is thought to be endemic to Papua New Guinea. The habitat consists of mountainous areas.

References

Lithosiina
Moths described in 1912